"Eye to Eye" is a song by British band Go West, which was released in 1985 as the fourth single from their debut studio album Go West. It was written by Peter Cox and Richard Drummie, and produced by Gary Stevenson. "Eye to Eye" reached No. 73 on the US Billboard Hot 100 and No. 32 on the Billboard Hot Dance Club Songs chart.

For its release as a single, the song was given a remix by the American synthpop duo The System. To promote the song, the band performed it on Soul Train in October 1985.

Critical reception
Upon release, Cash Box listed the song as one of their feature picks during August 1985 and commented: "With moderate success from its first two singles, this versatile and astute British group's latest release is an R&B tinged song which shows soul and heart. A nice crossover effort." In a review of the 12" single, Cash Box said: "Go West's most R&B flavored cut is here remixed by the System and the result is a Hall & Oates-ish version guaranteed to be a strong urban player." Billboard recommended the song and described the song as "blue-eyed synth-soul" and "Doobie-ish".

In a review of the Go West album, People said: "...still, the LP's best cuts, "Goodbye Girl" and "Eye to Eye", are little more than blatant soul knockoffs. But hey, if it comes out this tasty, why not go ahead?" In the Digital Audio's Guide to Compact Discs, a review of the album noted: "The singles "We Close Our Eyes" and "Call Me" attack you with greater clarity and more drive than you'll hear on the radio. The same holds true with the remaining seven cuts, most notably "Haunted" and "Eye to Eye.""

Track listing
7" single (US release)
"Eye to Eye" - 3:32
"Man in My Mirror" - 4:28

7" single (Japanese release)
"Eye to Eye" - 3:32
"Dreamworld" - 4:13

7" single (New Zealand release)
"Eye to Eye" - 3:32
"Haunted" - 3:18

12" single
"Eye to Eye (Credibility Mix)" - 5:45
"Eye to Eye (Horizontal Mix)" - 5:05
"Eye to Eye (Credibility Dub Mix)" - 4:50

Personnel
Go West
 Peter Cox - lead vocals, guitar, keyboards
 Richard Drummie - keyboards, bass

Production
 Gary Stevenson - producer
 The System - remixing, additional production on "Eye to Eye", "Credibility Mix" and "Credibility Dub Mix"
 Go West, Julian Mendelsohn, Ron Fair - remixing on "Horizontal Mix"

Other
  Aaron Rapaport - photography
  Ria Lewerke - art direction, design

Charts

References

1985 songs
1985 singles
Chrysalis Records singles
Go West (band) songs
Songs written by Peter Cox (musician)
Songs written by Richard Drummie